The following is a list of the exports of Andorra.

Data is for 2018, in millions of United States dollars, as reported by The Observatory of Economic Complexity. Currently the top eleven exports are listed.

References

Andorra
Exports